The Hitler Youth (often abbreviated as HJ) was the youth organisation of the Nazi Party in Germany. Its origins date back to 1922 and it received the name  ("Hitler Youth, League of German Worker Youth") in July 1926. From 1936 until 1945, it was the sole official boys' youth organisation in Germany and it was partially a paramilitary organisation. It was composed of the Hitler Youth proper for male youths aged 14 to 18, and the German Youngsters in the Hitler Youth ( or "DJ", also "DJV") for younger boys aged 10 to 14.

With the surrender of Nazi Germany in 1945, the organisation de facto ceased to exist. On 10 October 1945, the Hitler Youth and its subordinate units were outlawed by the Allied Control Council along with other Nazi Party organisations. Under Section 86 of the Criminal Code of the Federal Republic of Germany, the Hitler Youth is an "unconstitutional organisation" and the distribution or public use of its symbols, except for educational or research purposes, is illegal.

Origins 
In 1922, the Munich-based Nazi Party established its official youth organisation called .

One reason the Hitler Youth so easily developed was that regimented organisations, often focused on politics, for young people and particularly adolescent boys were a familiar concept to German society in the Weimar Republic. Numerous youth movements existed across Germany prior to and especially after World War I. They were created for various purposes. Some were religious and others were ideological, but the more prominent ones were formed for political reasons, like the Young Conservatives and the Young Protestants. Once Hitler came onto the revolutionary scene, the transition from seemingly innocuous youth movements to political entities focused on Hitler was swift.

Following the abortive Beer Hall Putsch (in November 1923), Nazi youth groups ostensibly disbanded, but many elements simply went underground, operating clandestinely in small units under assumed names. This event took place a year after the Nazi Party was reorganised. The architect of the re-organisation was Kurt Gruber, a law student from Plauen in Saxony.

After a short power struggle with a rival organisation—Gerhard Roßbach's —Gruber prevailed and his "Greater German Youth Movement" became the Nazi Party's official youth organisation. In July 1926, it was renamed  ("Hitler Youth, League of German Worker Youth") and, for the first time, it officially became an integral part of the SA. The name  was taken up on the suggestion of Hans Severus Ziegler. Girls from 10 to 18 were given their own parallel organisation, the League of German Girls (BDM).

In April 1932, Chancellor Heinrich Brüning banned the Hitler Youth movement in an attempt to stop widespread political violence. However, in June, Brüning's successor as Chancellor, Franz von Papen, lifted the ban as a way of appeasing Hitler, the rapidly ascending political star. A further significant expansion drive started in 1933, after Baldur von Schirach was appointed by Hitler as the first  (Reich Youth Leader). All youth organizations were brought under Schirach's control.

Doctrine 
The members of the Hitler Youth were viewed as ensuring the future of Nazi Germany and they were indoctrinated in Nazi ideology, including racism. The Hitler Youth were used to break up church youth groups, spy on religious classes and Bible studies, and interfere with church attendance. Education and training programs for the Hitler Youth were designed to undermine the values of traditional structures of German society. Their training also aimed to remove social and intellectual distinctions between classes, to be replaced and dominated by the political goals of Hitler's totalitarian dictatorship. Besides promoting a doctrine of classlessness, additional training was provided that linked state-identified enemies such as Jews with Germany's previous defeat in the First World War, and societal decline. The Hitler Youth were indoctrinated with the myths of Aryan racial superiority and to view Jews and Slavs as subhumans. Sacrifice for the cause was instilled into their training. Former Hitler Youth Franz Jagemann said that the notion "Germany must live" even if the members of the HJ had to die was "hammered" into them. As historian Richard Evans observes, "The songs they sang were Nazi songs. The books they read were Nazi books."  

The Hitler Youth appropriated many of the activities of the Boy Scout movement (which was banned in 1935), including camping and hiking. However, over time it changed in content and intention. For example, many activities closely resembled military training, with weapons training, assault course circuits and basic tactics. The aim was to turn the HJ into motivated soldiers. There was greater emphasis on physical ability and military training than on academic study. More than just a way to keep the German nation healthy, sports became a means of indoctrinating and training its youth for combat; this was in keeping with tenets outlined in Hitler's notorious work, . In a 1936 edition of Foreign Affairs, an article discussing the appropriation of sports by contemporary dictatorial regimes such as Nazi Germany commented that:

Organisation 

The Hitler Youth was organised into corps under adult leaders, and the general membership of the HJ consisted of boys aged 14 to 18. The Hitler Youth was organised into local cells on a community level. Such cells had weekly meetings at which various Nazi doctrines were taught by adult leaders. Regional leaders typically organised rallies and field exercises in which several dozen Hitler Youth cells would participate. The largest gathering usually took place annually at Nuremberg, where members from all over Germany would converge for the annual Nazi Party rally. Since the HJ and BDM were considered fully Aryan organizations by Nazi officials, premarital sex was encouraged in their ranks. This did not conform to the general beliefs of the Nazi Party, which viewed premarital sex as undesirable and a potential public health hazard.

The Hitler Youth maintained training academies comparable to preparatory schools, which were designed to nurture future Nazi Party leaders. The Hitler Youth also maintained several corps designed to develop future officers for the Wehrmacht (Armed Forces). The corps offered specialised foundational training for each of the specific arms for which the member was ultimately destined. This organisation within the Hitler Youth was a training ground for future labour leaders and technicians. Its symbol was a rising sun with a swastika. A program entitled  (Country Service Camp) was designed to teach specifically chosen girls of the BDM high moral character standards within a rural educational setting.

Membership 
In 1923, the youth organisation of the Nazi Party had a little over 1,200 members. In 1925, when the Nazi Party was refounded, the membership grew to over 5,000. Five years later, national membership stood at 26,000. By the end of 1932, it was at 107,956. The Nazis came to power in 1933, and the membership of Hitler Youth organisations increased dramatically to 2,300,000 members by the end of that year. Much of this increase came from the forcible takeover of other youth organisations. The sizeable  (Evangelical Youth), a Lutheran youth organisation of 600,000 members, was integrated on 18 February 1934. In December 1936, a law declared the Hitler Youth to be the only legally permitted youth organisation in Germany, and stated that "all of the German youth in the Reich is organised within the Hitler Youth".

By December 1936, Hitler Youth membership had reached over five million. Parents who refused to allow their children to join were subject to investigation by the authorities. From then on, the vast majority of Germany's teenagers belonged to the Hitler Youth. By 1940, it had eight million members.

Even before membership was made mandatory in 1939, German youth faced strong pressure to join. Students who held out were frequently assigned essays with titles such as "Why am I not in the Hitler Youth?" They were also the subject of frequent taunts from teachers and fellow students, and could even be refused their diploma—which made it impossible to be admitted to university. A number of employers refused to offer apprenticeships to anyone who was not a member of the Hitler Youth. By 1936, the Hitler Youth had a monopoly on all youth sports facilities in Germany, effectively locking out non-members. Hitler spoke of the regime's ability to make Nazis out of these German youth, exclaiming in 1938: 

Over time, a number of boys dropped out due to the regimented nature of the organization. Some of these boys later rejoined after they learned that they could not get a job or enter university without being a member. There were a few members of the Hitler Youth who privately disagreed with Nazi ideologies. For instance, Hans Scholl—the brother of Sophie Scholl and one of the leading figures of the anti-Nazi resistance movement  (White Rose)—was also a member of the Hitler Youth.

Despite rare instances of disaffection, overall, the Hitler Youth constituted the single most successful of all the mass movements in the Third Reich.

World War II 

Axmann began to reform the group into an auxiliary force which could perform war duties. The Hitler Youth became active in German fire brigades and assisted with recovery efforts to German cities affected by Allied bombing. The Hitler Youth also assisted in such organisations as the Reich postal service, the Reich railway services, and other government offices; members of the HJ also aided the army and served with anti-aircraft defence crews.

By 1943, Nazi leaders began turning the Hitler Youth into a military reserve to replace manpower which had been depleted due to tremendous military losses. The idea for a Waffen-SS division made up of Hitler Youth members was first proposed by Axmann to  Heinrich Himmler in early 1943. The plan for a combat division made up of Hitler Youth members born in 1926 was passed on to Hitler for his approval. Hitler approved the plan in February and Gottlob Berger was tasked with recruiting. Fritz Witt of SS Division Leibstandarte (LSSAH) was appointed divisional commander.

In 1944, the 12th SS-Panzer-Division Hitlerjugend was deployed during the Battle of Normandy against the British and Canadian forces to the north of Caen. Over 20,000 German youths participated in the attempt to repulse the D-Day invasion; while they knocked out 28 Canadian tanks during their first effort, they ultimately lost 3,000 lives before the Normandy assault was complete. During the following months, the division earned a reputation for ferocity and fanaticism. When Witt was killed by Allied naval gunfire, SS- Kurt Meyer assumed command and became the divisional commander at age 33.

As German casualties escalated with the combination of Operation Bagration and the Lvov-Sandomierz Operation in the east, and Operation Cobra in the west, members of the Hitlerjugend were recruited at ever younger ages. During the Battle of Berlin, Axmann's Hitler Youth formed a major part of the last line of German defence, and they were reportedly among the fiercest fighters. Although the city commander, General Helmuth Weidling, ordered Axmann to disband the Hitler Youth combat formations, in the confusion this order was never carried out. The remnants of the youth brigade took heavy casualties from the advancing Russian forces. Only two survived.

Post World War II 

The Hitler Youth was disbanded by Allied authorities as part of the denazification process. Some Hitler Youth members were suspected of war crimes but, because they were children, no serious efforts were made to prosecute these claims. While the Hitler Youth was never declared a criminal organisation, its adult leadership was considered tainted for corrupting the minds of young Germans. Many adult leaders of the Hitler Youth were put on trial by Allied authorities, and Baldur von Schirach was sentenced to 20 years in prison. Axmann only received a 39-month prison sentence in May 1949, but he was not found guilty of war crimes. Later, in 1958, a West Berlin court fined Axman 35,000 marks (approximately £3,000, or US$8,300), about half the value of his property in Berlin. The court found him guilty of indoctrinating German youth with National Socialism until the end of the war, but concluded that he was not guilty of war crimes.

German children born in the 1920s and 1930s became adults during the Cold War years. Since membership was compulsory after 1936, it was neither surprising nor uncommon that many senior leaders of both West and East Germany had been members of the Hitler Youth. Little effort was made to blacklist political figures who had been members, since many had little choice in the matter. These German post-war leaders were nonetheless once part of an important institutional element of Nazi Germany. Historian Gerhard Rempel opined that Nazi Germany itself was impossible to conceive without the Hitler Youth, as their members constituted the "social, political, and military resiliency of the Third Reich" and were part of "the incubator that maintained the political system by replenishing the ranks of the dominant party and preventing the growth of mass opposition." Rempel also reports that a large percentage of the boys who served in the HJ slowly came to the realization that "they had worked and slaved for a criminal cause", which they carried for a lifetime. Some of them recalled a "loss of freedom" and claimed that their time in the HJ "had robbed them of a normal childhood." Historian Michael Kater relates how many who once served in the HJ were silent until older age when they became grandparents. While they were eventually able to look back at their place in "a dictatorship which oppressed, maimed, and killed millions", he maintains that an honest appraisal should lead them to conclude that their past contributions to the regime had "damaged their own souls."

Once Nazi Germany was defeated by the Allied Powers, the Hitler Youth—like all NSDAP organisations—was officially abolished by the Allied Control Council on 10 October 1945 and later banned by the German Criminal Code.

Ranks and uniforms

 (Reich Youth Leader) was the highest rank of the Hitler Youth and was held by the Nazi Party official in command of the entire organization.

Members' summer uniform consisted of black shorts and a tan shirt with pockets, worn with a rolled black neckerchief secured with a woggle, usually tucked under the collar. Headgear originally consisted of a beret, but this was discarded by the HJ in 1934. One flag/symbol used by the HJ was the same as the DJ, a white Sowilo rune on a black background, which symbolised "victory". Another flag used was a red–white–red striped flag with a black swastika in the middle, inside a white shaped diamond. Full members would also receive a knife upon enrolment, with the motto "Blood and Honour" engraved upon it.

Troop colours: 
 : Area and  staffs
 : GeneralHJ
 : Flyer-HJ
 : Motor HJ
 : Communications-HJ
 : HJ-agriculture service
 : 
 NSDAP educational institutions
 HJ-Patrol service (1943):
 Navy-HJ
 Mounted-HJ:
 HJ-mountain walk groups
 HJ-fire brigade units:
 HJ-field surgeon:
 BDM-health service girl
 Mountain-HJ:

See also 
 National Socialist German Students' League
 National Socialist Schoolchildren's League
 Hitler Youth Badge
 Vorwärts! Vorwärts! – Anthem of Hitler Youth
 Opera Nazionale Balilla – Italian Fascist youth movement
 Great Japan Youth Party – Japanese Fascist youth movement
 Nationale Jeugdstorm – Dutch Fascist youth movement
 Jojo Rabbit – satire film about Hitler Youth

References 
Informational notes

Citations

Bibliography

External links 

 "Neville Chamberlain writes to the Hitler Youth" on archive.org

 
1922 establishments in Germany
1945 disestablishments in Germany
Articles containing video clips
German Youth Movement
Nazi Party organizations
Organizations disestablished in 1945
Youth in Germany
Youth organizations established in 1922
Youth wings of fascist parties